Bartłomiej Stefan Adamus (born 12 May 2000) is a Polish weightlifter. He represented Poland at the 2020 Summer Olympics in Tokyo, Japan. He competed in the men's 96 kg event.

In 2019, he won the bronze medal in the men's 89kg event at the Junior World Weightlifting Championships held in Suva, Fiji. At the 2021 European Junior & U23 Weightlifting Championships in Rovaniemi, Finland, he won the bronze medal in his event.

References

External links 
 

Living people
2000 births
Place of birth missing (living people)
Polish male weightlifters
Weightlifters at the 2020 Summer Olympics
Olympic weightlifters of Poland
21st-century Polish people